Lucie Pohl (born April 15, 1983) is a German actress and stand-up comedian.

Pohl is the daughter of theater director and singer Sanda Weigl and the actor and dramatist . She is sister of writer Marie Pohl and cousin of actress Anna Thalbach. She is also a relative of Bertolt Brecht. Pohl is the voice actress for the hero Mercy in the video game Overwatch. She featured in the Red Dwarf episode "Twentica" as Harmony de Gauthier.

Filmography

Film

Television

Video games

Stand-up
Hi Hitler (2014)
Cry Me a Liver (2015)

References

External links 

German women comedians
1983 births
Living people
German film actresses
German television actresses
German video game actresses
German voice actresses
Actresses from Hamburg
German emigrants to the United States
21st-century German actresses